"Perfect Night" is the second single from British recording artist Peter Andre's seventh studio album, Accelerate. The single was released on 3 July 2011 via digital download, with a physical release following a day later, exclusive to retailer QVC. The song was written by Taio Cruz and Guy Chambers, and was produced by Pete "Boxsta" Martin. The song has been heavily mixed for the single release.

Background
On 31 March 2011 Andre performed by the song at the Children's Champion Awards in London. Andre has also performed the song on Daybreak and This Morning. The video for the song features footage from Andre's live tour performances, as well as the home studio sessions where he recorded a remixed version of the song. The video premiered on Starz on 10 June 2011. The song was also featured in his reality show a lot and showed behind the scenes of the video.

Track listing

Charts

Release history

References

2011 singles
Peter Andre songs
Songs written by Taio Cruz
Songs written by Guy Chambers
2010 songs